Manikkavacakar, or Maanikkavaasagar (Tamil: மாணிக்கவாசகர், "One whose words are like gems"), was a 9th-century Tamil saint and poet who wrote Tiruvasakam, a book of  Shaiva hymns. Speculated to have been a minister to the Pandya king Varagunavarman II (c. 862 CE–885 CE) (also called Arimarthana Pandiyan), he lived in Madurai. 

He is revered as one of the Nalvar ("group of four" in Tamil), a set of four prominent Tamil saints alongside Appar, Sundarar and Sambandar. The other three contributed to the first seven volumes (Tevaram) of the twelve-volume Saivite work Tirumurai, the key devotional text of Shaiva Siddhanta. Manikkavacakar's Tiruvasakam and Thirukkovaiyar form the eighth. These eight volumes are considered to be the Tamil Vedas by the Shaivites, and the four saints are revered as Samaya Kuravar (religious preceptors)

His works are celebrated for their poetic expression of the anguish of being separated from God, and the joy of God-experience, with his ecstatic religious fervour drawing comparisons with those of Western saints like St. Francis of Assisi.

In his expression of intimacy to God, Manikkavacakar mirrored the sentiments expressed by his fellow Bhakti period saints referring to the Lord as the "Divine Bridegroom" or the Nityamanavaalar ("Eternal Bridegroom"), with whom he longed to be united in "divine nuptials"

Life 

Manikkavacakar is said to have born in Vadhavoor (known today as Thiruvathavur, near Melur seven miles from Madurai in modern day Tamilnadu state in South India).

He belonged to the Pandithar  Shaiva temple priest guild. His father was a temple priest. The group wore a top tilted knot "Purva Sikha" to denote servitorship to the god Shiva. A mural and statuette of Manikkavacakar with Purva Sikha head knot is seen in Tirupperunturai near Pudukkottai. A poetic and elaborate hagiography of Manikkavacakar and his works was written in the 16th century and is called Tiruvilayadal puranam, meaning "An account of divine deeds". Another called Vadhavoorar puranam and yet another Sanskrit work of the 12th century CE on the same saint is now missing.

According to accounts, the king of Pandyan dynasty had selected Manikkavacakar as a part of his legion after seeing his military acumen. He was conferred the title "Thennavan bhramarayan" by the Pandyan king and had once entrusted him with a large amount of money to purchase horses for his cavalry. On his way he met an ascetic devotee of Shiva, who in fact was the god himself. Manikkavacakar received enlightenment, realised that material things are transitory and built the temple of Shiva in Tirupperunturai with the money. King Varaguna also was preached with knowledge of reality and blessed with salvation after Shiva made him realize his small worldly mistake.

Manikkavacakar's birth name is unclear, but he was known as Vadhavoorar after his birthplace. Manikkavacakar means 'man with words as precious as Manikam'.

According to Ramana Maharshi, Manikkavacakar attained salvation by merging in a blinding light.

Literary work

Thereafter Manikkavacakar moved from one place to other, singing and composing devotional songs. Finally, he settled in Chidambaram. His Tiruvasakam is placed near the murti of Shiva there. Several verses of Tiruvasagam including the accho patikam after singing which he attained mukti at Thillai Natarajar's feet are also engraved in the walls of the chidambaram temple. The tiruchazhal hymn after singing which the communal Buddhists were exposed is also engraved in one of the prakarams. The work tiruchitrambalakkovaiyar was sung entirely in Thillai Chidambaram. Throughout his work he discusses how important it is to forego attachments and cultivate dispassionate, devoted, sincere and simple hearted love to lord Shiva in order to attain his beatitude and also that the five letters of na ma si va ya alone give one mukti.

Manikkavacakar's work has several parts. The Thiruvempavai, a collection of twenty hymns in which he has imagined himself as a woman following the  Paavai Nonbu  and praising Shiva. The twenty songs of Thiruvempavai and ten songs of  Tiruppalliezhuchi  on the Tirupperunturai Lord are sung all over Tamil Nadu in the holy month of  Margazhi  (The 9th month of the Tamil calendar, December and January).

Manikkavacakar is believed to have won intellectual arguments with Buddhists of Ceylon at Chidambaram. His festival is celebrated in the Tamil month of  Aani  (June - July). Manikkavacakar's hagiography is found in the Thiruvilaiyadar Puranam (16th century CE).

In 1921, an English translation of Manikkavacakar's hymns was done by Francis Kingsbury and GE Phillips, both of United Theological College, Bangalore (Edited by Fred Goodwill) and published in a book as Hymns of the Tamil Śaivite Saints, by the Oxford University Press

Associated temples
Manikkavacagar visited various temples in Thanjavur, North Arcot, Chengalpattu, Madras, Tirunelveli and Madurai districts and revered the deities.
Sculptures illustrating his life are found in the Minakshi-Sundaresvara temple at Madurai.
 Manikkavacakar is said to have built the temple of Siva in Tirupperunturai.
 He is said to have lived at Chidambaram Tamil Nadu.
 He is closely associated with Tiru Uthirakosamangai.

Tiruvempavai is sung along with Andal's Tiruppavai widely across the temples in Tamil Nadu during the Tamil month of Margazhi (December - January).

Manikkavackar's stone image is worshiped in almost all Shiva temples of Tamil Nadu. He is sported with one of his right hand in upadesa posture and left hand holding a palm leaf manuscript. He is sported wearing a thin loin cloth and sports sacred thread over his chest. Unlike other idols, in this idol he is sported with locks of hair encircled with beads of Rudraksha. The bronze images are stored in the Bronze gallery in Government Museum, Chennai.

Notes

References

External links
 Thiruvempavai explanation meaning
 Thirupalliyezhuchi explanation meaning

Writers from Madurai
Bhakti movement
Carnatic music
Tamil poets
Indian male poets
9th-century Indian poets
Poets from Tamil Nadu
Tamil Hindu saints